Middleton is a hamlet in the Craven district of North Yorkshire, England, part of the civil parish of Cowling. It is near the border with West Yorkshire located west of Keighley, West Yorkshire and consists of only one row of stone-built cottages.

Villages in North Yorkshire
Craven District